The Sons are a Derbyshire-based alternative rock band, though their music incorporates sounds from various other genres, including rhythm and blues, folk and country, with a heavy emphasis on intricately layered musical composition and lyrical complexity. Currently, The Sons are composed of lead singer/main songwriter and guitarist/pianist Paul Herron, multi-instrumentalist and vocalist Steven Herron, guitarist and vocalist Stewart English, bassist Lee Blades, and percussionist Roger Millichamp. 

The band runs their own record label Cannon Fodder Recordings.

History

Early days
The Sons' origins trace back to 1994, when Paul Herron met Ken Reeves while attending the University of Derby and the two of them, both aspiring singer/songwriters and guitarists, decided to form a band. Herron and Reeves soon recruited a bass player, Lee Blades, and a drummer, Matt Dewsnap, by hanging up posters around campus.  When Herron and Reeves discovered that Blades lived only two doors down from their house on Uttoxeter New Road, Derby, the quartet adopted the name "New Road" as their band name.

New Road continued to play local venues like The Garrick in and around Derby until Reeves left for southern England in 1996. Before Reeves’ departure, New Road connected with Stewart English, the owner of Clostrophobia Recording Studios on Agard Street in Derby, and began recording one of the first of the band’s many demos. Unfortunately, English was later forced to close his studio, but quickly joined New Road – though, soon after the addition of English, Dewsnap left the group due to friendly but creative differences, and was replaced by Matthew Paton. 

The change in line-up inspired a change in name – from New Road to Sub-marine – and the band continued to hone their skills by playing shows in their native Derby, London and France.

The Sons
In 2003, the band self-financed and released their first single "One Man Floats", followed by the four track EP1 in 2004.  The release of "One Man Floats" required the band to settle on a permanent name, and after drawing up a list of possibilities, they settled on The Sons.

Visiting Hours and Popup-Records
After promoting several demos without being signed by a label, the band decided to produce and distribute their first album, Visiting Hours in 2007, followed by a seven-date British tour in the summer of 2008.

The Prime Words Committee and American release
The Prime Words Committee was recorded at Snug Recording Co. in Derby between May 2010 and February 2011.  The thirteen tracks on the album were selected from nineteen completed tracks and the remaining six were set aside for future B-sides.  At the special request of a Swiss fan that had previously seen the band at Gaswerk, The Sons flew into Zurich and played a private party at Portier in Winterthur on 10 September 2011.

The Sons' Heading Into Land won the award for "Adult Contemporary Album" at The 2015 14th Annual Independent Music Awards.

Style
In a 2011 interview with the Derby Telegraph, The Sons’ main songwriter, Paul Herron, said of his writing style:

Touring

The Sons first European tour dates (2009) 

6 March - Rockhouse, Derby, England
15 March - Golden Fleece, Nottingham, England
20 March - Ms Treue, Bremen, Germany
21 March - Michelle Records, Hamburg, Germany
21 March - Gruner Jager, Hamburg, Germany
22 March - De Cantine, Amsterdam
23 March - Kaltscha Club, Dortmund, Germany 
24 March - Damen und Herren, Düsseldorf, Germany
25 March - Subway to Peter, Chemnitz, Germany
26 March - Riff, Magdeburg, Germany
27 March - Unikum, Halle, Germany
28 March - Sparte 4, Saarbrücken, Germany
29 March - Dimensione, Winterthur, Switzerland
30 March - L Club, Wurzburg, Germany
31 March - Cord, Munchen, Germany
2 April - Mokka, Thun, Switzerland
3 April - Cafe Pfeiffer Buchen, Germany
4 April - Club Im Park, Furstenwalde, Germany
5 April - Virgin Records, Berlin, Germany
5 April - Intersoup, Berlin, Germany
6 April - Blauer Engel, Kiel, Germany
7 April - Kinky Star Club, Gent, Belgium
10 April – Rockhouse, Derby

Paul Herron solo acoustic (2009)

10 June - Ms Treue, Bremen, Germany
11 June - Karo, Bremen, Germany
12 June - Irish Pub, Buxtehude, Germany
12 June - Indra, Hamburg, Germany

The Reeperbahn Festival (2009)

25 Sept. - Kaiserkeller, Hamburg, Germany

The Sons second European tour (2009)

16 Oct. - Rockhouse, Derby
26 Nov. - Musigbistrot, Bern, Switzerland
27 Nov. - Kellerclub, Stuttgart, Germany
28 Nov. - Gaswerk, Winterthur, Switzerland
30 Nov. - Pretty Vacant, Düsseldorf, Germany
1 Dec.- Cafe Video, Gent, Belgium
2 Dec. - Pools, Göttingen, Germany
3 Dec. - Astra Strube, Hamburg, Germany
4 Dec. - Cafe Momo, Rostock, Germany 
5 Dec. - Riff, Magdeburg, Germany
12 Dec. - Bar One, Derby, England

The Sons third European tour (2010) 

22 March - La Tana delle Rane, Reggio Emilia, Italy
23 March - La Salumeria del Rock, Arceto, Italy
25 March - MMB Club, Naples, Italy
26 March - Zena, Salerno, Italy
27 March - Contestaccio, Rome, Italy
28 March - Lofficina Della Musica, Lecco, Italy
30 March - Dimensione, Winterthur, Switzerland
31 March - Scopitone, Paris, France
1 April - De Rots, Antwerp, Belgium
3 April - Magnet, Berlin, Germany

Additional performances
26 September 2010 – Market Place, Derby, England
7 August 2011 – Ynot Festival, Derbyshire, England
21 October 2011 – The Old Bell, Derby, England

Discography

Singles and EPs
"One Man Floats" (2003)
EP1 (2004)

Albums
Visiting Hours (2007)
The Prime Words Committee (2011)
Heading Into Land (2014)

References

External links
 Official site
 The Sons on YouTube

English rock music groups
English alternative rock groups
Musicians from Derby
Musical groups established in 1994
Alumni of the University of Derby